Montezuma National Forest was established as the Montezuma Forest Reserve by the U.S. Forest Service in Colorado on June 13, 1905 with . It became a National Forest on March 4, 1907. On July 1, 1908 part of Ouray National Forest was added. On July 1, 1947 the entire forest was divided between San Juan National Forest and Uncompahgre National Forest and the name was discontinued.

References

External links
Forest History Society
Listing of the National Forests of the United States and Their Dates (from the Forest History Society website) Text from Davis, Richard C., ed. Encyclopedia of American Forest and Conservation History. New York: Macmillan Publishing Company for the Forest History Society, 1983. Vol. II, pp. 743-788.
The Proposed Montezuma Forest Reserve Colorado

Former National Forests of Colorado